The ATP Finals is the season-ending championship of the ATP Tour. It is the most significant event in the annual ATP calendar after the four majors as it features the top-eight singles players and top-eight doubles teams based on their results throughout the season. The eighth spot is reserved, if needed, for a player or team who won a major in the current year and are ranked from 8th–20th. The tournament is sometimes referred to as a "fifth Grand Slam," due to the prestige that comes with qualifying for and winning the event.

The tournament uses a unique format not seen in other ATP Tour events: The players are separated into two groups of four, within which they each play three round-robin matches. The top two players from each group after the round-robin stage move on to the semifinals, followed by a final to determine the champion.

The tournament was first held in 1970, although it was then known by a different name. Roger Federer and Novak Djokovic hold the record for the most singles titles with six, while Peter Fleming and John McEnroe jointly hold the record for the most doubles titles with seven.

In the tournament's current format, the champion can earn a maximum of 1,500 ranking points, if they win the event as an undefeated champion in the round-robin stage.

By winning the 2022 ATP Finals title, Djokovic earned a record $4,740,300, highest payday in singles. Also, Rajeev Ram and Joe Salisbury claimed $930,300, the highest payday in doubles prize money.

Tournament

History 
The ATP Finals is the fifth iteration of a championship which began in 1970. It was originally known as the Masters Grand Prix and was part of the Grand Prix tennis circuit. It was organised by the International Lawn Tennis Federation (ILTF) and ran alongside the competing WCT Finals. The Masters was a year-end showpiece event between the best players on the men's tour, but did not count for any world ranking points.

In 1990, the Association of Tennis Professionals (ATP) took over the running of the men's tour and replaced the Masters with the "ATP Tour World Championships". World ranking points were now at stake, with an undefeated champion earning the same number of points they would earn for winning one of the four Grand Slam events. The ITF, who continued to run the Grand Slam tournaments, created a rival year-end event known as the Grand Slam Cup, which was contested by the 16 players with the best records in specifically Grand Slam tournaments that year.

In December 1999, the ATP and ITF agreed to discontinue the two separate events and create a new jointly-owned event called the "Tennis Masters Cup". As with the Masters Grand Prix and the ATP Tour World Championships, the Tennis Masters Cup was contested by eight players. However, the player who was ranked number eight in the ATP Champion's Race world rankings was not guaranteed spot. If a player who won one of the year's Grand Slam events finished the year ranked outside the top eight, but still within the top 20, he was included in the Tennis Masters Cup instead of the eighth-ranked player. If two players outside the top eight won Grand Slam events, the higher placed player of the two in the world rankings took the final spot in the Tennis Masters Cup. This accommodation for Grand Slam winners who are nevertheless ranked outside the top eight continues in the event's current form.

In 2009, the championship was renamed the "ATP World Tour Finals" and was held at The O2 Arena in London. The contract ran through 2013, but was extended up to 2015 in 2012, and another time until 2018 in 2015. In 2017 the event was renamed the "ATP Finals" and the contract with the O2 Arena was extended to 2020. In December 2018 it was announced that London, along with Manchester, Singapore, Tokyo and Turin were on a shortlist of five cities which made the cut from an initial list of 40 cities to host the event starting from 2021. In April 2019, the ATP announced that Turin is going to host the ATP Finals from 2021 to 2025.

For most of its history, the event has been considered the most important indoor tennis tournament in the world (there were a few exceptions when the event was held outdoors: 1974 in Melbourne & 2003-04 in Houston). The indoor atmosphere allows for controlled conditions of play, both in terms of the court surface and the court's illumination.

In recent years it has been played on indoor hard courts, however, indoor carpet was used in some previous editions. On one occasion, when Melbourne hosted the event in 1974, the grass courts of Kooyong Stadium were used; the tournament was staged only 1-2 weeks before the 1975 Australian Open, which was also played on grass. Apart from 1974, all tournaments have been on a hard court variant, which has prompted calls from some players (chiefly Rafael Nadal) to feature a greater variety of surfaces, including clay courts. However, others disagree and have argued that clay court events already comprise a large chunk of the tennis calendar. As it stands, the ATP is not apt to change the event from an indoor hard court competition.

For many years, the doubles event was held as a separate tournament staged the week after the singles competition, but more recently both events have been held together during the same week and in the same venue.

In 2020, amid the COVID-19 pandemic and in an effort to reduce the number of staff on-site, the ATP introduced live electronic line-calling powered by Hawk-Eye Live. Instead of line umpires, the system detects the relevant movements of the player and where the ball bounces on court. A pre-recorded voice announces "Out," "Fault," and "Foot fault." Video review can be used for suspected double bounces, touches, and other reviewable calls.

The tournament has traditionally been sponsored by the title sponsor of the tour; however, in 1990–2008 the competition was not sponsored, even though the singles portion of the event, as part of the ATP Tour, was sponsored by IBM. In 2009, the tournament gained Barclays PLC as its title sponsor. Barclays confirmed in 2015 that they would not renew their sponsorship deal once it expires in 2016. On 25 May 2017, it was announced that Nitto Denko will be the main sponsor for the tournament, at least until 2020. On 10 September 2020, Nitto Denko announced it will extend its title partnership of the ATP Finals for another five years, until 2025.

Qualification 
The criteria to qualify for the ATP Finals are as follows:

 Players who finish the season ranked in the top 7 automatically qualify.
 The eighth spot is reserved for a player who won a Grand Slam event in the current year and is ranked from 8th–20th.
 If more than one player won a Grand Slam event in the current year and is ranked from 8th–20th, then whichever of these players is highest-ranked is awarded the eighth spot; whichever of these players is second highest-ranked is made first alternate.
 If there is no player who won a Grand Slam event in the current year and is ranked from 8th–20th, then the eight spot is awarded to the player ranked eighth, irrespective of Grand Slam results.

Two alternates also attend the ATP Finals. If the first alternate has already been selected according to (3) mentioned above, then the second alternate is the highest-ranked player who has not otherwise qualified for the event. If both alternate spots are available, they are awarded to the two highest-ranked players who did not otherwise qualify for the event.

An alternate can replace a player who withdraws before the round-robin stage is over, so long as the player who withdraws still has at least one round-robin match left to play. When an alternate enters the competition, his results are considered separately, i.e. the alternate does not inherit the results of the player he is replacing. If an alternate's round-robin results qualify him for the semifinals, then he may continue into the single-elimination rounds.

Format 
Unlike other events on the ATP Tour, the ATP Finals is not a straightforward single-elimination tournament. The eight players are divided into two groups of four and each play three round-robin matches against the other players in their group. After the round-robin stage, the top two players in each group advance to the semifinals. The two winners of the semifinals play a final to determine the champion. In this format, it is theoretically possible to advance to the semifinals even with as many as two round-robin losses, but no player in the history of the singles tournament has won the title after losing more than one round-robin match.

To create the groups, the eight players are seeded according to rank. The #1 and #2 seeds are placed in Group A and Group B, respectively. The remaining seeds are drawn in pairs (#3 and #4, #5 and #6, #7 and #8); the first of the pair to be drawn goes to Group A and the other to Group B, and so on.

The format described above has been in place for all editions of the tournament except the following years:
 1970–71: All round robin (no groups), no semifinals or finals, the winner was decided based on round-robin standings.
 1982–84: 12-player three-round single-elimination tournament (no round robin), the top four seeds received byes in the first round.
 1985: 16-player four-round single-elimination tournament (no round robin), no byes.

Group standings 
Since 2019, the group standings at the end of the round-robin stage are determined by, in order:
 Most matches won.
 Most matches played (for example: the record 1–2 beats 1–1, and 2–1 beats 2–0).

If some players are tied, the following tiebreakers are used depending on how many players are tied (two or three):

If two players are tied, then:
 Head-to-head round-robin result.

If three players are tied, then the following tiebreakers are used, in order, until all three players are no longer tied OR until only two players are tied, at which point the two-player tie is broken by the head-to-head round robin result:
 Highest % of sets won.
 Highest % of games won.
 Highest ranking at the start of the tournament.

When calculating tiebreakers, a match that ended in a retirement is counted as a 0–2 sets loss for the retiring player and a 2–0 sets win for their opponent, regardless of the actual score when the retirement occurred. When calculating the "Highest % of games won" tiebreaker, a match that ended in a retirement is disregarded.

Singles venues

Points and prize money 
The ATP Finals currently (2022) rewards the following points and prize money, per victory:

 An undefeated champion would earn the maximum 1,500 points, and $4,740,300 in singles or $930,300 in doubles.

Additional prizes include the ATP Finals trophy and the ATP year-end No. 1 trophy, all made by London-based silversmiths Thomas Lyte.

Past finals

Singles

Doubles

List of champions 
 Current through 2022 ATP Finals (active players in bold).

Records and statistics 
 Current through 2022 ATP Finals (active players in bold).

Singles

Doubles

Youngest & oldest champions

Year-end championships triple & double

Double crown 
 Winning the year-end championships in both singles and doubles in the same year.

Year-end championships triple

Masters Cup – WCT Finals double

Masters Cup – Grand Slam Cup double

WCT Finals – Grand Slam Cup double

Year-end championships generations double

Sponsors 
The tournament has traditionally been sponsored by the title sponsor of the tour; however, in 1990–2008 the competition was non-sponsored, even though the singles portion of the event as part of the ATP tour was sponsored by IBM. In 2009, the tournament gained Barclays PLC as title sponsor. Barclays confirmed in 2015 that they would not renew their sponsorship deal once it expires in 2016.

On 25 May 2017, it was announced that Nitto Denko will be the main sponsor for the tournament, at least until 2020.

On 10 September 2020, Nitto Denko announced it will extend its title partnership of the ATP Finals for another 5 years, until 2025.

See also 
 WCT Finals
 Grand Slam Cup
 ATP Finals appearances
 WTA Finals
 ATP Tour Masters 1000

References

External links 

 Official website 
 TennisTV: Official live streaming website

 
Finals
Recurring sporting events established in 1970
1970 establishments in Japan